Woolstenhulmes & Rye was a company that manufactured stationary steam engines.  It was based in Oldham, Lancashire, England.  The company produced large steam-driven engines for textile mills in Oldham and elsewhere.

History
Abraham Seville & Co started business in 1821 in Mumps, Oldham as roller makers for textile machinery. By 1828, William Woolstenhulme had entered the business, they had moved to the Lower Moor Ironworks and were spindle makers, iron and brass founders. The name was changed to Seville and Woolstenhulme. The business expanded and by 1846 they were employing 250 workers and were manufacturing self-acting mules and power looms. In 1854 they exhibited a 12 hp steam engine.

William Rye, an engineer from Manchester, entered the business in 1840 and married the senior partner's daughter in 1842. When Seville retired in 1855, Rye took the partnership. The firm became Woolstenhulme & Rye. About this time they closed the machine-making side of the business and concentrated on producing steam engines for the mills. Rye was mayor of Oldham in 1868. He was responsible for construction of Albert's Mount housing in Derker. The company was incorporated in 1873.

Woolstenhulme & Rye engines are said to be conservative in design, and although Gurr & Hunt claim that there was no evidence that the company had ever used Corliss valves, in his Black Book engine list, Arthur Roberts documents their use in Parkfield Mill. This engine was a 1,200-hp cross-compound engine. It had a  HP (high pressure) cylinder,  LP (low pressure) cylinder, with a  stroke. It was steamed at 140 psi. The  flywheel ran at 52 rpm. Transmission was by a geared drive. There were Corliss valves on the HP cylinder and slide valves on the LP, in fact a classic Lancashire configuration. The air pump was driven by a bell crank from the LP tail rod.

Mills driven by their engines
Woolstenhulme & Rye produced mill engines in the 1860s, but their principal period of production was in the 1870s, when they produced 17 engines giving a total of 10,970 ihp, and in the 1880s, when they made 22 engines giving 11,000 ihp, before they fell into financial difficulties and were liquidated in 1888.
Parkfield Mill, Oldham – 1874
Prince of Wales Mill, Oldham – 1875
West End, Mill, Oldham – 1878
Duke Mill, Shaw – 1883
Thornham No.2 Mill, Royton – 1885

References

Notes

Bibliography

Industrial Revolution
Steam engine manufacturers
Companies based in Oldham